Saleh Morsi, born in Kafr El-Zayat in 1929, was an Egyptian screenwriter and novelist best known for his espionages thrillers. He died of a heart attack in Alexandria, Egypt in August 1996.
The number of his books translated into Persian.

Works 
 Raafat el-Haggan, television series.
 Samia Fehmi, novel.

References 

1929 births
Egyptian novelists
1996 deaths
20th-century novelists